Canwood is a village in the Canadian province of Saskatchewan within the Rural Municipality of Canwood No. 494 and Census Division No. 16.

History 

Since it was settled, Canwood has gone through four name changes. Records kept by the post office show the original name of the settlement was Parksiding, but no evidence has shown it ever operated under that name. The post office opened September 1, 1911, operating under the name McQuan; this was a typographical error, and three months later the name was corrected to McOwan. This name honoured Alexander McOwan, a pioneer settler who was an immigration agent, estate manager, and author. On June 1, 1912, the community's name was changed again to Forgaard to honour Jens Forgaard, a Norwegian-born settler who had emigrated from Minnesota. Exactly one year later, on June 1, 1913, the name was changed for the last time to Canwood, which is a portmanteau of Canadian Woodlands. Canwood incorporated as a village on July 18, 1916.

Geography 
Canwood is located along Highway 55, and neighbours the towns of Debden and Shellbrook. It has 20 campsites, a nine-hole golf course, and three baseball diamonds, and is open May through September.

Demographics 

Education

Canwood Community School is the only educational institution in Canwood. Part of the Saskatchewan Rivers School Division #119, it educates students from Kindergarten to Grade 12. Higher education can be pursued out of town at the Saskatchewan Institute of Applied Science and Technology, University of Saskatchewan, or University of Regina.

Urban legend 
An urban legend says Albert Einstein played goal for the Canwood Canucks one winter while travelling to find peace and silence for his work on the Theory of Relativity. This story has been found to be implausible by media observers; in addition to the unlikeliness of Einstein visiting the rural community of Canwood, the Canwood Canucks hockey team was formed in 1958, three years after his death.

See also

 List of communities in Saskatchewan
 List of villages in Saskatchewan

References

External links

Villages in Saskatchewan
Canwood No. 494, Saskatchewan
Division No. 16, Saskatchewan